Greg "Fingers" Taylor (born June 3, 1952) is an American harmonica player, best known for his work with Jimmy Buffett's Coral Reefer Band.

Career
Greg Taylor was born in Wichita, Kansas, June 3, 1952 where he attended Wichita North High School.

Taylor and Buffett met in 1970 when Taylor was a student at The University of Southern Mississippi. Soon after the two met, Taylor joined Larry Raspberry and The Highsteppers. In 1974, Buffett called Taylor to ask him to join the first official Coral Reefer Band. Taylor continued to play in the band until 2000. Jimmy Buffett was booked to open for the Association at Arkansas State University in the Fall of 1972.  Fingers Taylor appeared with JB that night.  They were well received by the crowd.  

Taylor's nickname, "Fingers", was given to him in 1969 by John "Johnny Rock" Buffaloe (so nicknamed by Taylor) during their time in The Buttermilk Blues Band in Jackson, Mississippi.  At the time, Taylor played keyboards for the band, hence the nickname "Fingers."  Taylor began playing harmonica during his time in the band.

Taylor has released five studio albums: Harpoon Man (1984), Chest Pains (1991), New Fingerprints (1992), Old Rock 'n' Roller (1996) and Hi Fi Baby (2003). He has also released two compilation albums: Greatest Hits (1998) and Back to the Blues (2000).

Over the years, Buffett has recorded a couple of Taylor's songs. "Big Rig" was included on Buffett's 1976 album Havana Daydreamin' and Taylor and Buffett co-wrote "Miss You So Badly" included on Buffett's 1977 album Changes in Latitudes, Changes in Attitudes. Buffett and the Coral Reefer Band also included "Dixie Diner", originally recorded by Larry Raspberry and The Highsteppers, on Buffett's 1978 live album You Had to Be There.

Buffett and Taylor also teamed up on "Some White People (Can Dance)," a staple of Taylor's repertoire. The song was included on Taylor's 1989 album Chest Pains.

From 2000 - 2005 Greg "Fingers" Taylor toured and recorded extensively with pure trop rock singer/songwriter Don Middlebrook and his band Living Soul. Together they recorded four albums: "I Can't Spell Caribbean," "Changing Lanes," "Boat Drink Island," and "Traveling Music."  Some of Taylor's finest work is found on "Traveling Music," particularly the song "Like a River She Rolls."

In 1998, Greg appeared with A1A – The Official and Original Jimmy Buffett Tribute Show on their debut album, "A1A Live." Greg performed with A1A many times throughout the '90s and 2000s.

, Taylor was regularly touring with singer-songwriter, K.D. Moore and has done some shows with the Atlanta-based singer-songwriter Jim Asbell, and also toured in 2007 with singer-songwriter Hugo Duarte from North Carolina. Taylor is featured on K.D. Moore's 2004 live album Live at the Tin Goose Saloon, Moore's 2006 studio album Kickin' It Island Style and was a guest artist on Asbell's 2007 studio release, Tropiholics.

At the Riverbend Music Center in Cincinnati, Ohio, on June 8, 2006, Taylor joined Buffett and the Coral Reefer Band on stage.

Taylor is now retired due to Alzheimer's disease. He resides in Pearl, Mississippi.

Discography
 Harpoon Man (1984)
 Chest Pains (1989)
 New Fingerprints (1991)
 Old Rock 'n' Roller (1996)
 Greatest Hits (1998)
 Back to the Blues (2000)
 Hi Fi Baby (2003)

References

1951 births
Living people
American blues singers
American blues harmonica players
Blues musicians from Mississippi
Musicians from Wichita, Kansas
University of Southern Mississippi alumni
People with Alzheimer's disease
American harmonica players
American male singers
Songwriters from Kansas
Songwriters from Mississippi
Singers from Kansas
Coral Reefer Band members
American male songwriters